Katastari is a village and a community in the Alykes municipal unit of the island Zakynthos, Greece. It is situated at the foot of the Vrachionas mountain, 2 km from the Ionian Sea coast. It is located 13 kilometers northwest of Zakynthos City and 10 km southeast of Volimes. In 2011, the population of Katastari was 1,378 inhabitants.

Population

References

External links
Greek Travel Pages - Katastari

Populated places in Zakynthos